Andrey Fridrikhovich Borodin (born Moscow, 24 May 1967) is a Russian financial expert, economist and businessman who until 2011 was President of Bank of Moscow. He and his first deputy Dmitri Akulinin were dismissed from office by the court for the period of the investigation due to the Premier Estate criminal case, charged with abuse of authority.
 In April 2011, the meeting of the bank's shareholders dismissed them.

Since April 2011, Borodin has lived in London, England, and since November 2011 until May 2016 has been on an Interpol Red Notice, wanted as a suspect in a 13-billion-rouble fraud committed in Bank of Moscow under his governance. In August 2012 he bought Park Place, a house near Henley-on-Thames. He was granted political asylum in the UK in February 2013.

Education and early career 
Borodin serviced in the KGB Border Troops from 1985–87. Following his service, he enrolled at the Moscow Finance Institute. From 1989 to 1990 while at the Moscow Finance Institute, he studied economics as a visiting student at the University of Passau, Germany, and then returned to Moscow and graduated with a degree in International Economics and Finance from the International Economics Department at the Moscow Finance Institute in 1991. For two years, he worked for Dresdner Bank in Germany - which has deep ties to former members of the KGB and Stasi services - on an 18-month training course in Dortmund, then moved to Frankfurt and worked at the bank’s head office in the Financial Institutions Department. He left Dresdner Bank in late 1993, moved to Moscow, and in March 1994, was introduced to the Mayor of Moscow, Yury Luzhkov by Lev Alaluev, and started working for the Government of Moscow as an economics and finance adviser to the Luzhkov.

His relationships with Luzhkov, currently persona non grata in Russia since his dismissal by then-president Dmitry Medvedev in 2010, have been important for both his rise and current problems.

Bank of Moscow
What became one of the biggest players in Russian banking began as a six-person operation founded in 1995 by the Moscow City Government, which originally held a 51% stake. Under the political patronage of Luzhkov and the leadership of Borodin it weathered the crisis of 1998 and subsequently grew rapidly from a local bank largely serving the City Government to a national bank with a greatly enlarged client base and offering a broad range of services. The bank became increasingly independent of the City Government, which in 2008 reduced its stake to 46.6%, with a corresponding reduction in the number of bank-appointed directors. As the bank expanded, Borodin and his ally Lev Alaluev purchased significant stakes of their own – more than 20.32%. There was no evidence on how Borodin and Alaluev got the necessary funding for such a big purchase.

Krasny Okyabr
The Andrei Borodin led Bank of Moscow was a large creditor of Krasny Oktyabr when it declared bankruptcy in 2009. Andrey Akimov, as the interim manager of the plant, appointed the Ukrainian Dmitro Gerasimenko, who is the owner of Dieg-Impex LLC, to be executive director of Krasny Oktyabr and who in November 2018 "sold" the plant to Pavel Krotov.

Bank of Moscow internationally known
Bank of Moscow enjoyed the confidence of the international markets, with both Goldman Sachs and Credit Suisse acquiring small stakes in 2010 (3.88% and 2.77% respectively).

Bank of Moscow takeover
When Luzhkov was dismissed in September 2010, the new mayor Sergei Sobyanin announced the intention to sell the stake of the Moscow  government in Bank of Moscow. VTB, a state-controlled bank, stepped up as a buyer. Other banks, such as Alfa Bank and Bank Austria, a subsidiary of UniCredit, also expressed interest.

In December 2010, before the sale of the City Government's stake took place, the Audit Chamber of the Russian Federation announced that it had launched an audit of Bank of Moscow at Sobyanin's request. The investigation revealed a loan provided by the bank to Premier Estate Company.

At the end of February 2011 VTB purchased the City Government's stake from Central Fuel Company. The VTB deal was opposed by Borodin.  He resisted to attempts by VTB to acquire control of the bank, already being one of the main shareholders.

Borodin has contested the legality of this on a number of grounds, including that competitive tender ought to have been used to maximise the share price. None of the protests were found correct or justified by court. Borodin and his allies were dismissed and VTB's Chairman Andrey Kostin and first deputy Mikhail Kuzovlev became the Bank’s Chairman of the Board of Directors and President respectively.

In early April 2011 Borodin and Lev Alaluyev sold their 20.32% stake in Bank of Moscow. Andrey Borodin sold his shares to Vitaly Yusufov, son of the former Russian Energy Minister Igor Yusufov. Vitaly Yusufov had borrowed US$1.1 billion from Bank of Moscow for this acquisition. Borodin was still in charge of the bank, when this decision was made.

In July 2011 Yusufov sold his stake to VTB, which in September 2012 controlled more than 95.50 percent of the shares of Bank of Moscow. Yusufov claimed, that he acted on his own judgment. That was the reason, why the price negotiations with VTB took so long.

Borodin claims that peculiarities during the takeover point to the centrality of political as opposed to commercial concerns.  For example, he made an offer on 22 March 2011, which lapsed 8 April 2011, to buy the stake from VTB as the same price they had, despite VTB's claims of the mess they had discovered. This was refused, because there was no official offer sent.

Bank of Moscow bail-out and criminal charges
After the takeover, VTB and finance minister Alexei Kudrin (who was the head of Supervisory Council of VTB during the takeover) announced that the bank's former management, led by Andrei Borodin, created a "large, special portfolio loan book" totaling 366 billion roubles to lend to itself and related parties. Among these loans, some 250 billion roubles has been identified as falling in a "zone of risk", and 150 out of 250 billion were 'very bad' and lacked collateral.

In July 2011 it was announced that Bank of Moscow would receive a US$14 billion bail-out from the Russian state.

In February 2012 Russia's Interior Ministry has opened a new criminal case against Borodin and Dmitry Akulinin, over the theft of 6.7 billion roubles at the Bank. According to the investigator, Borodin and Akulinin, in 2008 through 2011, using their office position, arranged the transfer of at least 7.8 billion roubles from a correspondent account of the Bank of Moscow to the accounts of commercial companies registered in Cyprus. None of the firms involved in the criminal scheme engaged in any financial or economic activity. The settlement accounts of the fly-by-night firms were serviced by a Cyprus bank.

In March 2012 Investigative Committee spokesman Vladimir Markin told the new the case over a 1.7 billion-rouble damage caused to the Bank of Moscow is investigated.  
The Bank of Moscow and the Moscow government held a controlling stake in “City Insurance Group”. Fearing the loss of control over the company's activities and transfer of 50 percent plus one share to the VTB bank, former president and vice-president of Bank of Moscow Andrei Borodin and Dmitry Akulinin worked out a criminal scheme in which they involved subordinates from the administrations of affiliates.  As a result of transactions with the securities from October 2010 through March 2011, the control over City Insurance Group passed to an offshore company, which caused a 1,708,635,380-rouble damage to the Bank of Moscow and its affiliates.

In October 2012 Russian investigators froze Borodin's assets, over $400 million, held in bank accounts in Switzerland, Belgium, Luxembourg. His Bank of Moscow shares were also seized.

In March 2013, international auditors from Deloitte Touche CIS confirmed the violations of the former senior management of Bank of Moscow during the period from January 2007 until March 2011. The auditors discovered that all loan agreements signed during that period had no conclusions from the bank’s credit risk department, which means the department never analysed the potential borrowers’ financial status. In addition, in some cases the collaterals used to secure the loans were not evaluated at their market value. Therefore, the international auditors have drawn the same conclusions as those from the Bank of Russia audit conducted in March–July 2011.

Exile and political asylum in the UK
In August 2012 Borodin bought Park Place, Britain’s most expensive house, near Henley-on-Thames, and paid  £140 million ($219 million) for it.

Speaking to Vedomosti newspaper on 1 March 2013, he said he had been granted political asylum in the UK "a few days ago" after his lawyers submitted a request. He also accused Russian Prime Minister Dmitry Medvedev, who was the country's president when the criminal case was launched, of being the "chief initiator of all this persecution and hounding".

On 13 May 2015 it was reported that a Russian Court had ordered the seizure of Andrei Borodin's Park Place mansion in Henley-on-Thames.

Notes

References

External links
 Official Website of Andrey Borodin

Russian bankers
Economists from Moscow
Living people
1967 births
KGB officers
Fugitives wanted by Russia
Russian emigrants to the United Kingdom
Fugitive financiers
Financial University under the Government of the Russian Federation alumni
Russian businesspeople in the United Kingdom